Movsar Evloev (born February 11, 1994) is a Russian mixed martial artist, who is currently competing in the featherweight division of the UFC. A professional since 2014, he has also competed at M-1 Global, where he is the former bantamweight champion. As of June 7, 2022, he is #10 in the UFC featherweight rankings.

Early life 

Evloev, who has a degree in computer programming and law, belongs to the Ingush teip Youvloy. Before turning professional in mixed martial arts in 2014, Movsar earned the rank of a Master of Sports in Greco-Roman wrestling.

Mixed martial arts career

M-1 Global 
Prior to competing in the Ultimate Fighting Championship, Evloev spent all his time in M-1 Global.

On April 22, 2017, Evloev faced Alexey Nevzorov for the M-1 Global Interim Bantamweight championship. He knocked out Nevzorov in the second round to claim the title.

Evloev then faced Pavel Vitruk for the undisputed title on July 22, 2017.  He defeated Vitruk by unanimous decision to unify the championship.

Following his championship victory, Evloev's first title defense was held in February 2018, against Sergey Morozov. He defeated him with a rear-naked choke in the third round.

In his next title defense, he faced Rafael Dias on July 21, 2018. He knocked Dias out in the fifth round to retain his belt.

In April, he vacated the championship and signed with the UFC.

Ultimate Fighting Championship 
Evloev was scheduled to make his promotional debut against Muin Gafurov on April 20, 2019 at UFC Fight Night: Overeem vs. Oleinik. However, Gafurov was replaced by Seung Woo Choi after a violation of his contract with ONE Championship. He won the bout by unanimous decision.

Evloev was then scheduled to face Mike Grundy on August 31, 2019 at UFC on ESPN+ 15. However, Grundy pulled out of the bout on August 19 citing an injury and was then set to be replaced by Zhenhong Lu. Hours out from the fight, Lu pulled out after suffering a cut.

In his second UFC appearance, Evloev faced Enrique Barzola on October 26, 2019 at UFC on ESPN+ 20. He won the fight by unanimous decision.

Evloev was then slated to face Douglas Silva de Andrade on March 7, 2020 at UFC 248. However, Andrade pulled out of the fight and was set to be replaced by Jamall Emmers. On February 26, Evloev pulled out of the contest for unknown reasons.

Evloev faced Mike Grundy on July 26, 2020 at UFC on ESPN: Whittaker vs. Till. He won the fight by unanimous decision.

Evloev was scheduled to face Nate Landwehr on December 5, 2020 at UFC on ESPN 19 However hours before the start it was cancelled after Movsar tested positive for COVID-19.

Evloev met Nik Lentz, replacing Mike Grundy,  at UFC 257 on January 24, 2021.  He won the fight via split decision.

Evloev faced Hakeem Dawodu on June 12, 2021 at UFC 263. He won the fight via unanimous decision.

Evloev was expected to face Ilia Topuria on January 22, 2022 at UFC 270. However, Evloev withdrew from the bout after a positive COVID-19 test and he was replaced by Charles Jourdain

Evloev faced Dan Ige on June 4, 2022 at UFC Fight Night 207. He won the fight via unanimous decision.

As the first bout of his new multi-fight contract, Evloev was scheduled to face Bryce Mitchell on November 5, 2022 at UFC Fight Night 214. However, Evloev withdrew in mid October due to injury.

Championships and accomplishments
M-1 Global
M-1 Global interim Bantamweight Championship (one time; first)
M-1 Global Bantamweight Championship (one time; former)
Two successful title defenses

Mixed martial arts record

|-
|Win
|align=center|16–0
|Dan Ige
|Decision (unanimous)
|UFC Fight Night: Volkov vs. Rozenstruik
|
|align=center|3
|align=center|5:00
|Las Vegas, Nevada, United States
|
|-
|Win
|align=center|15–0
|Hakeem Dawodu
|Decision (unanimous)
|UFC 263 
|
|align=center|3
|align=center|5:00
|Glendale, Arizona, United States
|
|-
|Win
|align=center|14–0
|Nik Lentz
|Decision (split)
|UFC 257
|
|align=center|3
|align=center|5:00
|Abu Dhabi, United Arab Emirates
|
|-
|Win
|align=center|13–0
|Mike Grundy
|Decision (unanimous)
|UFC on ESPN: Whittaker vs. Till 
|
|align=center|3
|align=center|5:00
|Abu Dhabi, United Arab Emirates
|
|-
|Win
|align=center|12–0
|Enrique Barzola
|Decision (unanimous)
|UFC Fight Night: Maia vs. Askren
|
|align=center|3
|align=center|5:00
|Kallang, Singapore
|
|-
|Win
|align=center|11–0
|Seung Woo Choi
|Decision (unanimous)
|UFC Fight Night: Overeem vs. Oleinik
|
|align=center|3
|align=center|5:00
|Saint Petersburg, Russia
|
|-
|Win
|align=center|10–0
|Rafael Dias
|KO (punches)
|M-1 Challenge 95
|
|align=center|5
|align=center|0:21
|Nazran, Russia
|
|-
|Win
|align=center|9–0
|Sergey Morozov
|Submission (rear-naked choke)
|M-1 Challenge 88
|
|align=center|3
|align=center|3:47
|Moscow, Russia
|
|-
|Win
|align=center|8–0
|Pavel Vitruk
|Decision (unanimous)
|M-1 Challenge 81
|
|align=center|5
|align=center|5:00
|Nazran, Russia
|
|-
|Win
|align=center|7–0
|Alexey Nevzorov 
|KO (head kick)
|M-1 Challenge 76
|
|align=center|2
|align=center|2:15
|Nalchik, Russia
|
|-
|Win
|align=center|6–0
|Lee Morrison
|Decision (unanimous)
|M-1 Challenge 73
|
|align=center|3
|align=center|5:00
|Nazran, Russia
|
|-
|Win
|align=center|5–0
|Aleksander Krupenkin
|TKO (punches)
|M-1 Challenge 66
|
|align=center|1
|align=center|4:09
|Orenburg, Russia
|
|-
|Win
|align=center|4–0
|Djulustan Akimov 
|Submission (rear-naked choke)
|M-1 Global: Battle in Nazran 3
|
|align=center|2
|align=center|2:01
|Nazran, Russia
|
|-
|Win
|align=center|3–0
|Andrey Syrovatkin
|Submission (rear-naked choke)
|M-1 Global: Battle in Nazran
|
|align=center|1
|align=center|1:44
|Nazran, Russia
|
|-
|Win
|align=center|2–0
|Zhenhong Lu
|Decision (unanimous)
|M-1 Challenge 58
|
|align=center|2
|align=center|5:00
|Ingushetia, Russia
|
|-
|Win
|align=center|1–0
|Jianwei He
|Submission (rear-naked choke)
|M-1 Challenge 53
|
|align=center|2
|align=center|1:45
|Beijing, China
|
|-

See also
 List of current UFC fighters
 List of male mixed martial artists
 List of undefeated mixed martial artists

References

External links
 

Featherweight mixed martial artists
Mixed martial artists utilizing Greco-Roman wrestling
Ultimate Fighting Championship male fighters
Russian male mixed martial artists
1994 births
Living people
People from Ingushetia
Ingush people